Randy Josselyn (born February 1, 1974) is an American film and television actor whose TV appearances include Family Matters, Undressed, 7th Heaven, The Fresh Prince of Bel-Air, Picket Fences and Full House.

Early life and education
He was born on February 1, 1974, in Los Angeles, California. He graduated from Trabuco Hills High School in 1992.

Career
He first started his career by appearing in 104 episodes of Down to Earth as J.J. Preston.  This was later followed by an appearance in Dolly in 1987, starring as Andy Colby in the film Andy Colby's Incredible Adventure, Punky Brewster and Too Good To be True in 1988.

He also starred in Fever Lake (1996) with Corey Haim and Mario Lopez.

Filmography

Film

TV

References

External links

American male television actors
American male film actors
20th-century American male actors
1974 births
Living people
Male actors from Los Angeles
American male child actors